Seqdel (also Romanized as Saqdal; also known as Bālā Saqdal) is a village in Yurchi-ye Sharqi Rural District, Kuraim District, Nir County, Ardabil Province, Iran. At the 2006 census, its population was 41, in 8 families.

References 

Tageo

Towns and villages in Nir County